Igor Ivanovich Shuvalov (born 4 January 1967) is a Russian politician. Since May 2018 he became the Chairman of State Development Corporation VEB.RF (Ex-Vensheconombank).

From May 2012 to May 2018 he was First Deputy Prime Minister in Dmitry Medvedev's Cabinet. Previously, he served in the same capacity in Vladimir Putin's Second Cabinet. As First Deputy Prime Minister, he was the most senior member of the cabinet after the Prime Minister and was responsible for the federal budget and economic policies.

Biography
Igor Shuvalov was born on 4 January 1967, in the town of Bilibino in Chukotka Autonomous Okrug, where his parents came to work. He graduated from high school in Moscow in 1984. Following a failed college matriculation in 1984 – 1985, he worked as a laboratory assistant at the Ekos Research Institute.

From 1985 to 1987 he completed compulsory military service in the Soviet Army, then enrolled into technical school. He later matriculated into the Faculty of Law at Moscow State University and graduated with a degree in Jurisprudence in 1993.
After graduation, Shuvalov was assigned as attaché to the legal department of the Ministry of Foreign Affairs, where he was responsible for pursuing developments in international law. The same year he joined the law firm 'ALM Consulting', named after Alexander Mamut where ALM stands for his initials A. L. Mamut. Shuvalov was senior attorney, then managing partner until 1997. The firm is affiliated with the Moscow Bar Association. In 1995 – 1996, Shuvalov became a co-founder of Stalker, a wholesale open joint-stock company (OJSC), Fanteim, a real estate OJSC, RANDO Joint-stock company (JSC), a consumer goods manufacturer, and the bank consortium of Channel One Russia JSC, which consolidated the capital of banks that held shares in Public Television of Russia JSC (ORT).

In 1997, Shuvalov was appointed as Head of the Department of the State Register of Federal Property on the State Committee of the Russian Federation for State Property Management, where he was responsible for cooperation with financial institutions and represented the interests of the state on the boards of directors of Rosgosstrakh and Sovcomflot. In January 1998, Shuvalov was appointed Deputy Minister of State Property. In February 1998, he was appointed as a member of the board of directors of Public Television of Russia.

On 25 May 1998, Shuvalov was appointed Acting Chairman of the Russian Federal Property Fund (RFPF) and in September he was confirmed as Chairman. While working with the fund, Shuvalov represented the interests of the state in a number of companies – the Russian State Insurance Company, ORT, the All-Union Exhibition Centre SJSC (VVC), Gazprom, and several others.

On 18 May 2000, after the appointment of Mikhail Kasyanov as Prime Minister of Russia, Shuvalov became a minister of the Russian Federation as Chief of Staff of the Government. On 28 May 2003, following a conflict with Kasyanov, he left the Government and was appointed to the position of Assistant to the President, where he coordinated the activities of the working group responsible for the development of measures to double the GDP, the fight against poverty, and military reform.

In October 2003, Shuvalov was appointed Deputy Head of the Presidential Administration. In 2004, he was appointed as the President's Representative to the National Banking Council, and he became Chairman of the Board of Directors of Sovcomflot until July 2008. In 2005, Shuvalov became the personal representative of the president at the G8 and, in 2006, he was Deputy Chairman of the organizing committee for the preparation and securement of Russia's chairmanship of the G8.

On 12 May 2008, he was appointed First Deputy Prime Minister of Russia. In the same year, he headed the government commission on the development of small and medium-sized businesses, the commission to coordinate government actions to combat the effects of the global financial crisis, the commission on the socio-economic development of the Far East and Transbaikal, and the organizing committee on preparation for the APEC summit.

Since 19 March 2009, Shuvalov has been the national coordinator of the affairs of the Commonwealth of Independent States. In October 2009, he was discharged from the National Banking Council. In January 2010, he headed the Joint Governmental Commission on economic development and integration.

Since August 2010, Shuvalov has been responsible for coordinating the efforts of federal executive agencies to consider inquiries from Russian and foreign investors, and formally remains in that position, following the June 2012 appointment of Boris Titov as Commissioner for the Protection of Entrepreneurs' Rights. Following the September 2011 resignation of the Minister of Finance and Deputy Prime Minister Alexei Kudrin, Shuvalov took charge of the government's economic bloc. The same year he was appointed to replace Kudrin as Head of the Council on Financial Markets and Representative of Russia on the board for the Eurasian Economic Commission.

On 25 March 2011, the newspaper Vedomost reported that Shuvalov considered the possibility of heading the Right Cause political party, citing a federal official and a source within the party. In 2011, Shuvalov headed the regional electoral list of the United Russia party as a Primorsky Krai candidate for the State Duma of the VI Convocation at the 4 December elections.

In January 2012, Shuvalov became the head of the government commission on transport and communication. On 21 May 2012 Shuvalov was appointed as First Deputy Prime Minister in the government formed that month.

On 3 March, the United States imposed visa restrictions and froze assets of Shuvalov, his wife, sons, and daughter due to the 2022 Russian invasion of Ukraine.

Professional activities

In 2009, an analyst with the electronic news site Slon.ru, Konstantin Gaaze, referred to Igor Shuvalov as "Putin's 'chief commander'" and an "engine in charge of 'it all'".  The expert noted that for Putin Shuvalov was the "official with the driving force who could get things off the ground", which is why he gets assigned "projects that are economic in nature but with an extremely important public policy component as well as strict deadlines that cannot be breached". Among these projects, the author named the G8 summit the "ideological support for national projects", and described it as the "finishing touches" on the trilateral Customs Union of Russia, Belarus, and Kazakhstan, which was the first step toward building an economic supranational institution in the post-Soviet space.

According to Slon.ru, Dmitry Medvedev wanted to see Shuvalov as the head of his administration during his presidency.  However, Shuvalov allegedly refused and joined the Putin government, thus becoming "a kind of a macroeconomic incarnation of the prime minister".

Government projects

Vladivostok APEC Summit 2012
In 2008, Igor Shuvalov became head of the organizing committee on preparation for the summit of the Asia-Pacific Economic Cooperation (APEC) forum, which was held in Vladivostok in September 2012. Preparation for the forum involved revamping of the city's infrastructure. The main construction sites were the cable-stayed bridge across the Eastern Bosphorus Strait to Russky Island, the cable-stayed bridge across the Zolotoy Rog Bay, and the new campus of the Far Eastern Federal University. The construction project for facilities for the summit was subjected to public criticism because of the high costs. Igor Shuvalov stated that none of the facilities built in Primorye were akin to a "Potemkin village". According to the First Deputy Prime Minister, facilities "for the show" and "Potemkin villages" were instances of an external facade with nothing behind, while, with the facilities built in Primorye, one could "come and see for yourself – you can either work or study here".

After completion of the summit, the director of the Center for Support for Regional Initiatives for the HSE NRU (Higher School of Economics National Research University) Ivan Ognev referred to Ivan Shuvalov as the "organizer of Putin's victories in Vladivostok, including the APEC summit of 2012, which drastically changed the city and the local mentality".

In January 2013, the Accounts Chamber announced that the total investment in the construction of facilities for the APEC summit was 690 billion roubles, of which 239 billion was funded by the state, the remaining funds coming from extra-budgetary sources; 99% of the funds were disbursed as budgeted. Shuvalov supported investigations into potential corruption in preparation for the APEC 2012 summit.

In November 2012, Roman Panov, the former Deputy Minister of Regional Development for the Russian Federation, was charged with large-scale fraud. At that time he held the post of Prime Minister of Primorsky Krai. On 20 November 2012, the head of the Far Eastern Directorate of the Ministry of Regional Development, Oleg Bukalov, resigned his post. Shuvalov stated that the Far Eastern Directorate of the Ministry of Regional Development was a "redundant link". He expressed the hope that the perpetrators of the embezzlement would be convicted. If someone steals during a project, "they should be thrown in jail," according to Shuvalov. Shuvalov believes that the APEC 2012 forum should help shift Russia's foreign trade balance toward Asian countries.

Socio-economic development of the Far East
In 2008, the Russian government established a state commission on the socio-economic development of the Far East, the Republic of Buryatia, the Transbaikal Krai, and the Irkutsk Oblast. The commission was headed by the First Deputy Prime Minister, Igor Shuvalov.

In 2013, the government raised the question of whether or not the existence of the Ministry of the Russian Federation for the Development of the Far East, formed in 2012, served a useful purpose. The proposed plan for socio-economic development of the Eastern Territories prepared by the agency had not been approved by any of the key ministries, while the amount of requested appropriations was more than 5.7 trillion roubles, which was beyond the resources of the Treasury. The government returned to the idea of consolidating the faculties for the development of the Far East region within a specialized state corporation. Igor Shuvalov, who oversaw the construction of facilities for the APEC summit in Vladivostok, was among the potential candidates considered for the position of Agency Chief.

On 31 August 2013, Vladimir Putin signed a decree dismissing Viktor Ishaev from his posts as Plenipotentiary Envoy of the President of the Russian Federation to the Far Eastern Federal District, and Minister for Development of the Far East. By another decree, the head of state appointed Yuri Trutnev as both Deputy Prime Minister and Plenipotentiary Envoy of the President to the Far Eastern Federal District.  The media referred to Trutnev's appointment as a "strategic success" for Igor Shuvalov.

In April 2013, the Prime Minister of Russia, Dmitry Medvedev, signed a program covering up until 2025, for the socio-economic development of the Far East and the Transbaikal Krai.  In the next 12 years approximately 10 trillion roubles will be invested in the program implementation from both the state budget and the funds of private investors.

Financial Mega-Regulator
In 2012, Igor Shuvalov proposed the idea of creating a regulator of the Russian financial markets based in the Central Bank of Russia (CBR). According to Shuvalov's plan, the strengthened Federal Financial Markets Service that is charged with the supervision, including that of insurance companies, would be merged into CBR. The concept of creating a mega-regulator proposed by Shuvalov was approved by the Russian President, Vladimir Putin, in January 2013.

Universiade 2013
In 2009, Igor Shuvalov became the head of the organizing committee for the 27th World Summer Universiade.

In May 2011, he reported that the construction schedule for more than 30 new sports facilities in Kazan was ahead of schedule. In May 2012, the General Director of the Kazan 2013 Executive Directorate, Vladimir Leonov, noted that over a period of three or four years, Kazan has been undergoing development that most cities take 20 years to achieve.

In December 2012, Igor Shuvalov announced that all preparations for the Universiade were proceeding on schedule. In mid-December, 2012, Sergei Stepashin, Chairman of the Accounts Chamber for the Russian Federation, stated that the Universiade 2013 facilities in the Capital of Tatarstan are 90% ready for launch.

On his official trip to Kazan, on 19 March 2013, the President of Russia, Vladimir Putin, visited the major Universiade facilities and noted the efficiency of the use of the funds for the construction of the main stadium for the games.  Altogether, 64 sports facilities were ready.

As part of the development of transport infrastructure of the city many commissions were granted, including: the new terminal 1A and the reconstructed terminal 1 of the Kazan International Airport along with the new Kazan-2 rail-bus interchange station, the reconstructed Kazan-1 main railway terminal, the second stage of the Kazan underground railway, the Kazan high-speed tram line, the Aeroexpress Line to the Kazan International Airport, 11 junctions, 41 pedestrian crossings, 23 highways with a total length of 65 km, and 63 city streets.

The final report for the FISU was issued on 30 June. After that, the Mayor of Kazan, Ilsur Metshin, President of FISU, Claude-Louis Gallien, and Chairman of the Russian University Sports Union, Oleg Matitsyn, declared Kazan 100% ready for the Universiade.

After the opening of the competition, Vladimir Putin stated that all the funds had been directed toward the development of the city, and to construction of the sports infrastructure and road junctions. "All of this has greatly improved the image of Kazan, which today has become a luxurious European city," said the President of Russia.

Upon completion of the Universiade, Igor Shuvalov was awarded an Order for Service to the Republic of Tatarstan and the badge of Honorary Citizen of the City of Kazan with the wording "for economic development and prosperity, enhancing the city’s reputation, and strengthening the image of the capital of Tatarstan in Russia and in the international arena".

The sports facilities built in Kazan will remain available to the people of the city and the republic, in contrast to the infrastructure of the 2014 Winter Olympics in Sochi, where some of the facilities will be moved to other cities.

FIFA World Cup 2018

On 16 December 2009, it was announced that Igor Shuvalov was heading the organizing committee in support of the nomination of Russia as a candidate to host the FIFA World Cup in 2018/2022. Russia, England, Belgium, Holland, Spain, and Portugal presented their bids in Zurich on 2 December 2010. Igor Shuvalov was part of the Russian delegation together with the Minister of Sports, Tourism, and Youth Policy, Vitaly Mutko, and football player Andrei Arshavin. Following the presentation, the 22 members of the FIFA Executive Committee held a secret ballot in which Russia was chosen as winner.

In January 2011, the honorary president of the Russian Football Union, Vyacheslav Koloskov, suggested that Igor Shuvalov should head the organizing committee for the 2018 World Cup. As part of the government formed in May 2012, Igor Shuvalov, among other things, coordinates the organization, preparation, and holding of the World Cup in 2018, including the issues of creating and developing the necessary transport infrastructure.

In March 2013, it was announced that the regions had requested 540 billion roubles to prepare for World Cup 2018, but the First Deputy Prime Minister of the Russian Federation, Igor Shuvalov, stated that the amount was excessive. It was decided that, in order to avoid misuse of federal funds, funding would only be made available for the construction of stadia and training facilities, as well as reconstruction of city airports and roads connecting the airports to the stadia. Expenditure on city infrastructure and road transport networks was excluded from the proposed preparation program. The regions must raise the funds for those purposes themselves, because those expenditures are not part of Russia's obligations to FIFA.

Controversies

Accusations of a conflict of interest
In December 2011, the U.S. Securities and Exchange Commission released information about Shuvalov's participation "in deals to acquire assets in the United States in the amount of $319 million, as well as providing Shuvalov with a loan for these purposes in the amount of $119 million at an astronomical rate of 40% per annum".

In March 2012, the Financial Times and the Wall Street Journal reported that the family of Igor Shuvalov acquired shares from Gazprom worth approximately $18 million via Sevenkey, a company registered in the Bahamas. Two days later, Alexei Navalny posted on his blog copies of documents that indicated that Shuvalov's company account received transfers of tens of millions of dollars from companies that, according to Navalny, were owned by billionaires Roman Abramovich and Alisher Usmanov.

The First Deputy Prime Minister reacted swiftly to the publications in the Western media by issuing the following statement: "Regarding declaring my income and the income of my family, I have always approached the matter in an exceptionally responsible manner. As a lawyer, I have invariably followed the rules and principles concerning conflicts of interest. The funds that I earned as a businessman, which are now in a managed trust, form the basis of my independence from various interested parties, in making my decisions as an official".

Artem Dymskoy, a partner at the law offices of ALM Feldmans, stated that the information about the activities of Igor Shuvalov's family trust may have been disseminated by his former lawyer Pavel Ivlev, who, having sticky fingers himself, was currently wanted by Interpol on charges of embezzling 2.4 billion dollars from YUKOS.

Dymskoy also confirmed that "Ivlev is acting to the detriment of the Shuvalov family by deliberately distorting the facts... We believe that Ivlev is deliberately manipulating the actual facts and circumstances to present a picture favorable to him, and he is doing so exclusively to advance his political goals and objectives".

In February 2012, the media reported that Pavel Ivlev had a business relationship and financial arrangements with Alexei Navalny, since Ivlev had hired Navalny as his own lawyer in the YUKOS case. The Office of the Prosecutor General of the Russian Federation conducted an audit and found no improprieties in the Shuvalov family's sources of income.

On 10 April 2013, Igor Shuvalov met with the editors of leading publications and demonstrated his assets and income declaration for 2011, mentioning the Severin Enterprises company that had been the focus of media attention. Severin Enterprises is an offshore company in the jurisdiction of the British Virgin Islands, owned 100% by Olga Shuvalov, the wife of the First Deputy Prime Minister of the Russian Federation.

Sanctions
Sanctioned by New Zealand in relation to the 2022 Russian invasion of Ukraine.

Personal life
Igor Shuvalov is married to Olga Viktorovna Shuvalova. The income of Shuvalov's spouse over two years amounted to more than 1 billion roubles: she earned 642 million roubles in 2009 and 365 million in 2008. She is a major business figure engaged in the sale of real estate in the Skolkovo Innovation Center offshore business, and trading in shares of Russian raw materials companies.

The Shuvalovs have two sons and two daughters.  After attending the Moscow School of Economics, their elder son, Evgeny (born 1993), enjoys swimming and equestrian sports, served in the Pacific Fleet Special Forces based on Russky Island from September 2011 through September 2012, on 31 July 2013 became the owner of a charter business jet company using the firm Global Jet to operate his Bombardier Global Express and on 11 May 2018 obtained a Gulfstream G650 for his company. Their elder daughter Maria (born 1998) is studying ballet at the Moscow State Academy of Choreography and was a rhythmic gymnast under Irina Viner. Their younger daughter Anastasia was born in 2002 and their youngest son was born in 2010.

Wealth 
According to the official assets and income data for 2009, Shuvalov's annual income was approximately 6.5 million roubles; his wife's approximately 642 million. The Shuvalovs' property includes several apartments and land plots with buildings, as well as seven cars. According to the Vedomost' newspaper, the Shuvalov family has a house in Austria and an apartment in the UK. In the assets and income declaration for 2011, the overseas real estate is marked by Shuvalov as "in use", as he had transferred all the family assets into a blind trust.

According to the 2012 declaration filed and posted on the Government of the Russian Federation's website, Igor Shuvalov is the wealthiest member of the government. His income was 226,386,929 roubles. In the same year his spouse Olga Shuvalova earned 222,009,378 roubles.

In 2014, Foreign Policy reported that Shuvalov's wealth was $220 Million.

The press regularly covers Shuvalov's extravagant lifestyle. The Times wrote that he "uses a £38 million private jet to transport his wife’s corgis to dog shows across Europe". Shuvalov owns a $15.3 million pair of London apartments. The Washington Times has covered the controversy surrounding Shuvalov's alleged ownership of an enormous $9.4 million apartment in Moscow.

Awards and honors
 Order of Alexander Nevsky (25 July 2013) — for his significant contribution to the State and many years of productive public service
 Honorary Diploma of the Government of the Russian Federation (28 May 2003) — for his significant personal contribution to meeting the challenges of the socio-economic development of the country
 Order for Service to the Republic of Tatarstan (2013)
 Honorary Citizen of the City of Kazan (2013)

References

External links

 Shuvalov's profile and assets on Russian Asset Tracker

1967 births
Living people
People from Chukotka Autonomous Okrug
Moscow State University alumni
Government ministers of Russia
1st class Active State Councillors of the Russian Federation
Members of the Council of the Eurasian Economic Commission
Lawyers from Moscow
Russian individuals subject to the U.S. Department of the Treasury sanctions
Russian individuals subject to European Union sanctions
Russian individuals subject to United Kingdom sanctions